is a professional Go player.

Biography 
Izumi Kobayashi grew up in a family of accomplished Go players. She has joked that she first played Go in her mother's womb. Her father is Koichi Kobayashi, the man who ranks third in number of titles held in Japan. Her maternal grandfather was Kitani Minoru, one of the leading players and probably the greatest Go teacher.  Her mother was Reiko Kobayashi née Kitani (1939–1996), 6 dan, who won the All-Japan Women's Championship several times. She became a professional go player in 1995, and was promoted to her current rank, 6 dan, in 2004. She is married to Cho U, one of the top players in Japan.

Promotion record

Titles & runners-up

References

1977 births
Japanese Go players
Living people
Female Go players